The  is a fictional divine magic sword in Nintendo's The Legend of Zelda series. It is also known as "The Blade of Evil's Bane", the "Sword of Resurrection", the "Sword that Seals the Darkness", and the "Sacred Sword". It was introduced in the 1991 action-adventure video game The Legend of Zelda: A Link to the Past and has since appeared in numerous other games in The Legend of Zelda series. The sword is the signature weapon of the hero, Link and has become an integral part of the character's visual identity and destiny in Zelda mythology. In the narrative of the Zelda series, it is a powerful, sacred weapon that Link repeatedly uses to defeat the main antagonist, Ganon and other forces of evil. Throughout the Zelda series, it is shown to have various magical powers, including the capability to repel evil, alter the flow of time and emit light beams to attack surrounding enemies. In addition to The Legend of Zelda series, the Master Sword has also appeared in various other video games, media and merchandise, including Super Smash Bros., Mario Kart 8 and Hyrule Warriors. It has been recreated in fan art, cosplay and weaponry and has become a widely recognisable image in video gaming.

Characteristics 

The Master Sword is a divine, magic sword and the signature weapon of Link, the hero of The Legend of Zelda series. It has become a defining aspect of Link's identity alongside the Hylian Shield. The majority of The Legend of Zelda video games follow a similar story arc that involves Link starting the game with a simple weapon and embarking on a journey that eventually leads him to recovering the Master Sword. Once he obtains it, the sword makes Link much stronger in combat so that the player has greater capability to defeat the main antagonist at the end of the game.

The Master Sword has been referred to by various names over the course of The Legend of Zelda series. In several games it is named the "Blade of Evil's Bane". In The Legend of Zelda: Breath of the Wild, the Master Sword is described as, "The legendary sword that seals the darkness." It is also named the "Master Sword of Resurrection". In Hyrule Warriors it is called "The Sacred Sword". In the mythology of the series, the Master Sword is defined as a divine object. In The Legend of Zelda: Skyward Sword, it originates in the Goddess Sword, created by the goddess Hylia. Over the course of the game, the Goddess Sword is transformed into the Master Sword, a powerful blade that has the magical ability to repel evil. As the goddess' chosen hero, Link repeatedly wields the sword in various titles to defeat Ganon (sometimes named Ganondorf), the main antagonist of the series, making it an integral aspect of the battle between good and evil. A recurring plot element is that the blade is traditionally found in its stone pedestal and must be pulled from the pedestal by Link to retrieve it. Although it is not always the strongest sword in Zelda games, the Master Sword is superior to other in-game weapons as it is the only weapon in most games that has the capability of defeating Ganon.

Since its first appearance in The Legend of Zelda series, there have been several versions of the Master Sword. The design of the sword has evolved over the course of each Zelda title, but it has become identifiable by its purple and silver design. In its first appearance in the 1991 action-adventure video game The Legend of Zelda: A Link to the Past, the Master Sword is a simple fantasy sword with a generic design. This early depiction evolved over subsequent years to transform into its contemporary design, which is a one-handed longsword blade featuring a blue or purple hilt with green grip, purple spread-winged handguards and a yellow gem inlaid in the centre. A defining feature of the sword is that it displays the Triforce, which is engraved on the blade just above the ricasso.

The sword possesses various magical abilities that can be used by Link during gameplay, such as creating fire attacks and lightning attacks in The Legend of Zelda: A Link to the Past. In The Legend of Zelda: Ocarina of Time, the sword works as a seal that protects the Sacred Realm and the Triforce. It can also alter time by placing it in its pedestal to send Link back to his childhood or by removing it again to travel to the future. In The Legend of Zelda: The Wind Waker the sword blocks the powers of Ganondorf and freezes time around Hyrule Castle, so that removing the blade from its pedestal restores Ganondorf's minions. In The Legend of Zelda: Twilight Princess Link uses it to open a path in time. In The Legend of Zelda: Skyward Sword it can be pointed towards the sky to gather energy from the heavens and launch a light beam known as a Skyward Strike. In The Legend of Zelda: A Link Between Worlds, the Master Sword is the only weapon that can break the magical barrier that is placed on Hyrule Castle. In Hyrule Warriors: Age of Calamity it emits light beams that deal high damage to surrounding enemies. In Breath of the Wild its superior qualities are indicated by its high durability, as it is the only weapon that is unbreakable and must be recharged before being wielded again. When in close proximity to enemies associated with Calamity Ganon, the Master Sword also glows blue and doubles its attack strength.

Throughout The Legend of Zelda series, the Master Sword has a unique relationship with its destined bearer, Link. This is summarised in a Breath of the Wild cutscene by Zelda.

In the mythology of the series, the Master Sword is created to be wielded by the chosen hero and chooses its own master. According to its fictional legend only someone pure of heart can draw the sword from its pedestal. Before he is able to claim it, Link must undergo various tests in order to prove himself worthy. In Skyward Sword, it is Link himself who transforms the Goddess Sword into the Master Sword, which reinforces his connection to it. A humanoid spirit named Fi is chosen by the goddess Hylia to act as a guide to Link. Her spirit resides in the Goddess Sword and by the end of the game she bids farewell to Link to sleep forever within the Master Sword. Throughout other Zelda titles, the Master Sword lies dormant in its pedestal to await the reincarnated hero, Link who is destined to save Hyrule from evil.

Development 
The Master Sword was first introduced to the series in the third entry, The Legend of Zelda: A Link to the Past. The French version of the game called it Excalibur, which originated from Arthurian Legend in the Welsh collection of Mabinogion. Subsequent entries continued to refer to it as Excalibur in the French versions of The Legend of Zelda: The Wind Waker and The Legend of Zelda: Twilight Princess.

In 2011, Nintendo released a video game titled The Legend of Zelda: Skyward Sword, which aimed to develop an early history of the fictional kingdom of Hyrule and create an origin story for the Master Sword. Zelda producer Eiji Aonuma commented that the game's premise was based on a desire to focus the story on the gameplay experience, which was built around the game's motion controls. He said: "This time, the theme is the sword which makes use of the Wii MotionPlus accessory... When you think of a sword in The Legend of Zelda, you think of the Master Sword. Rather early on, we decided to address the origin of the Master Sword". The story concept placed the sword at the centre of Zelda lore, but as it was not the first video game released in the series, the plot suffered from inconsistencies in relation to the pre-existing timeline. Skyward Sword director Hidemaro Fujibayashi explained: "We settled on having the sky and surface world, and on top of that, it was going to tell the story of the creation of Hyrule, with the untold story of the origin of the Master Sword... So, looking back at the series so far, we began knitting together the various elements. And then all sorts of contradictions arose". Despite these inconsistencies, the storyline established the Master Sword as a defining element of the narrative. The plot centres around Link transforming the weapon into the Master Sword. It gives Link the power to defeat the antagonist Demon King Demise by trapping his essence inside the sword. This storyline was the foundation for the lore of every other title in The Legend of Zelda series, with the Master Sword placed at the heart of its mythology. The sword was also used as the central game mechanic for the Wii version of Skyward Sword. A television commercial for the game's release in 2011 prominently featured the Master Sword as a way to connect the player to the game's motion controls, which involved using the Wii MotionPlus to control the sword's movements on screen.

Appearances

The Legend of Zelda series 
In the original 1986 The Legend of Zelda video game, a sword appears that predates the Master Sword. This early image of a sword is depicted as a standard fantasy weapon without any defining features, but as an early example, it was the precursor for future iterations of the Master Sword that would appear in subsequent titles. Over the course of the Zelda series, the Master Sword reappeared with each incarnation of Link and its design was changed over time to suit the character's appearance in each era.

The Master Sword was introduced in 1991 with the release of The Legend of Zelda: A Link to the Past, which was the third game in The Legend of Zelda series. The storyline involves Link setting out to rescue Princess Zelda by retrieving the blade from its pedestal in the Lost Woods and using it to defeat the main antagonists, the evil wizard Agahnim and finally, Ganon. Several concepts that originated in the game were repeated in subsequent games in the series, including Link drawing the sword from its pedestal and the sword being the only weapon capable of defeating Ganon. The game also gives Link the ability to upgrade the Master Sword firstly into the Tempered Sword and secondly into the Golden Sword to give it a stronger attack power. The Legend of Zelda: A Link to the Past Instruction Manual states that the player's first goal is to claim the Master Sword and explains that before he can wield it, Link must obtain three pendants representing courage, wisdom and power by defeating the masters of three dungeons. Once he has obtained the Master Sword, Link must head to the castle to do battle with Agahnim. However before Link defeats Agahnim, he is sent to the Dark World, a gloomy version of Hyrule. Link must then rescue the seven descendants of the Seven Sages and harness their combined power before he can defeat Ganon. 

In 1998 the Master Sword reappeared in The Legend of Zelda: Ocarina of Time and was the first iteration of the longsword design in 3D. The sword is again presented as the only weapon that is capable of defeating Ganon and is this time located in the Temple of Time, locked behind the Door of Time. It also acts as a gateway between Hyrule and the Sacred Realm. After Link has collected three Spiritual Stones he is able to open the Door of Time and claim the Master Sword from its pedestal. Due to his youth the sword seals Link in the Temple of Time for seven years until he is ready to be the Hero of Time. When Link journeys around Hyrule to awaken five of the Seven Sages, he can use the Master Sword to travel back in time by placing it in the pedestal.

A simpler version of the Master Sword appears in the 2001 game duo The Legend of Zelda: Oracle of Seasons and Oracle of Ages. The trademark features of the sword are not easily identified in these games due to the simplified in-game sprites. In the Oracle games, the Master Sword appears as a blue pixel sword. It diverges from the typical traits seen in other versions of the Master Sword, as it is found in a different location to the rest of the Zelda timeline and is breakable.

In The Legend of Zelda: The Wind Waker (2002) the Master Sword appears with a slightly different shape and design. In this storyline, Link finds the Master Sword inside the sunken Hyrule Castle. The sword blocks Ganondorf's magical powers and freezes time around the castle. When the blade is removed from its pedestal, it restores the life of Ganondorf's minions. Ganondorf's magic is also restored and the Master Sword loses its power to repel evil. The game involves Link seeking out two new sages to replenish the fading power of the sword. Once its magic has been restored, Link can destroy a magic barrier to Ganon's Tower. Eventually, Link destroys Ganondorf by plunging the Master Sword into his forehead and turning him to stone.

The Master Sword appears again in The Legend of Zelda: Twilight Princess (2006). In the storyline, Link must seek out its resting place deep in Faron Woods in the Sacred Grove, where the pedestal is located in the ruined Temple of Time. Link must retrieve the sword as it is the only way to break the magic of Zant, which has turned him into a wolf. When Link returns to the Sacred Grove, he uses the sword to open a path to a time before the Temple of Time was ruined. The sword is upgraded by infusing it with the light of the Sols, which makes it powerful against twilit creatures and gives it the ability to clear Dark Fog. At the end of the game the Master Sword is finally used to kill Ganondorf.

In The Legend of Zelda: Skyward Sword (2011), the Master Sword plays a central role in Link's journey to defeat the main antagonist, Demon King Demise and prove himself as the hero. The plot charts the weapon's transition from the Goddess Sword into the Master Sword. Link descends to the surface from Skyloft to obtain the Triforce and defeat Demon King Demise. He uses three Sacred Flames to transform the Goddess Sword into the Master Sword and then seals Demise inside the sword by placing it on its pedestal, which causes Demise to vow revenge. In Zelda story chronology, this act is the beginning of the endless cycle that places Zelda and Link in opposition to Ganon in all other Zelda titles. Following this, the humans are free to descend to the surface and establish the kingdom of Hyrule.

In The Legend of Zelda: A Link Between Worlds (2013), which is a successor to A Link to the Past, Link must retrieve the Master Sword from its pedestal in the Lost Woods after collecting three Pendants of Virtue. He must then rescue the Seven Sages and Princess Zelda, before saving Hyrule from Ganon. In the process, Link pursues the evil sorcerer Yuga, who transforms his victims into paintings. He meets Princess Hilda in the kingdom of Lorule, who informs him that the power of the Triforce almost destroyed her kingdom. Hilda and Yuga make a plan together to steal the Triforce from Hyrule and resurrect Ganon. During the game, the Master Sword is upgraded by blacksmiths in Hyrule and Lorule after Link collects master ore from various locations, making it a more powerful weapon.

The Master Sword makes a prominent appearance in The Legend of Zelda: Breath of the Wild (2017). As Link travels through Hyrule, he has the option of obtaining the sword once he is strong enough to pull it from its stone. In the storyline, Link must travel to Korok Forest and speak with the Great Deku Tree to retrieve the sword from the location where Zelda has left it for safe keeping. It appears heavily damaged and covered in Malice after being used in battle against Calamity Ganon 100 years before the events of the game. After successfully retrieving the Master Sword and purchasing the DLC, the player is given the opportunity to tackle one of the end game challenges named "The Trial of the Sword", which is aimed at advanced players. Upon successfully completing all of the levels, the player is bestowed with the advantage of the Master Sword being permanently at its highest attack level.

The Master Sword will appear in the upcoming Tears of the Kingdom, which is due to be released in 2023. One teaser footage shows Link holding the Master Sword, which appears heavily damaged or corrupted.

Other media 
The Master Sword has made appearances in various other video games. Link appears with the Master Sword as a playable character in the original 1999 Super Smash Bros. In Super Smash Bros Ultimate, Link also appears as a playable character in eight different costumes that include the Master Sword and Hylian Shield. The Master Sword has also made an appearance in Animal Crossing games and Soulcaliber II. In Nintendo Land, players can wield the Master Sword as part of The Legend of Zelda: Battle Quest. Link makes a cameo appearance with the Master Sword and the Hylian Shield in Scribblenauts Unlimited. In Bayonetta 2, Bayonetta is able to use the Master Sword after equipping Link's costume. In the racing game Mario Kart 8, the Master Sword was introduced with Link in the first DLC. It also makes an appearance in the Hyrule Circuit as a statue inside the castle. It is also obtainable as gear alongside the Hylian Shield in The Elder Scrolls V: Skyrim. The Master Sword was also introduced in Super Mario Maker 2 with a Zelda update in 2019. The sword transforms Mario into Link and bestows a range of special abilities.

In the hack and slash video game Hyrule Warriors (2014), the Master Sword appears as a prominent weapon. Link can use it in battle alongside the Hylian Shield, and after completing certain tasks, the sword has the capability of emitting the sword beam. The storyline centres on Link and his allies battling against the antagonist Cia and various other villains.

In Hyrule Warriors: Age of Calamity (2020), Link is able to use the Master Sword throughout the game after defeating an antagonist named Astor and retrieving the blade from its pedestal. Once obtained, Link is able to power up the sword by fusing other weapons into it. The fully maxed out Master Sword then unlocks an additional attack called the Sword Beam that attacks enemies from a distance.

The Master Sword has also been featured prominently in Zelda-related media, including books and other merchandise.

Reception 

Since its introduction in The Legend of Zelda series, the Master Sword has become a recognisable image in video gaming. Due to its popularity, the sword has been the subject of various works of fan art. It has been recreated in the form of fan-made replicas and also as a functioning weapon.

Over the course of the series, the sword has become an integral aspect of Link's identity, both visually and in terms of the character's development. It has been recreated by fans alongside the Hylian Shield as part of Link's signature costume for cosplay. Nintendo Power listed the Master Sword as one of the best weapons in gaming, citing that it is more than just a powerful sword, but also integral to Link's adventures and development as a character. Writing for Paste, Khee Hoon Chan commented on the significance of the Master Sword in the narrative of the Zelda storyline: "There are few scenes in entertainment as iconic as the image of young Link pulling the Master Sword from its pedestal, a virtual, modern retelling of The Sword and the Stone. More than just a weapon, the Master Sword came to be a symbol of Link's destiny, sealing him to the split timeline dividing the fate of Hyrule in the Legend of Zelda series".

The sword has received mixed comments with regards to its performance in gameplay. Sam Skopp for Looper highlighted the impracticality of the Master Sword in gameplay, noting that this is "not the result of its physical design, but rather how it manifests throughout the Zelda franchise". He continued by explaining that due to the prolonged quest lines in A Link to the Past and in Breath of the Wild, the Master Sword is "an impractical thing to obtain in the first place". Stephen Lagioia writing for Screen Rant highlighted the strengths of the Master Sword in the gameplay of Breath of the Wild: "While there are in fact stronger weapons in the game, it's hard to find a weapon that's all-around efficient as Link's iconic Master Sword. The perk of it never breaking gives it immense added value on its own, even when factoring in its 10-minute recharge. Add its attack power of 30 (which doubles when facing Calamity foes) and the Master Sword is a surefire pick". Avery Lawrence Feyrer for TheGamer chose the Master Sword as the most iconic and powerful weapon in video game history, ranking it above the Blue shell from Mario Kart.

Several critics have highlighted the impact and legacy of the weapon within gaming. The Master Sword was ranked as one of "The Coolest Swords Ever Seen in a Video Game" by Ron Whitaker for The Escapist magazine, who commented that "the Master Sword doesn't look all that special. It's not that big, it doesn't have flames rising from it, and it doesn't look all that intimidating. But in the hands of the right person, it can save the world". Whitaker also listed it as one of the most iconic video game weapons, saying that "it has the ability to repel evil, and in Ocarina of Time, it can be used to travel through time. In A Link to the Past, Link can even upgrade the sword to make it even more powerful. It's appeared in several other games, been created by swordsmiths and cosplayers alike, just as you would expect for such an iconic weapon". IGN staff consider the Master Sword to be the greatest or most iconic video game weapon of all time, and the act of pulling it out in Ocarina of Time the most unforgettable video game moment of all time. Destin Legarie from IGN wrote: "This beautiful sword is an icon to gamers everywhere, as well as an instantly recognizable item of central importance in the Zelda franchise. Sure, there have been plenty of great weapons and items in The Legend of Zelda series, but only the Master Sword has endured since the days of A Link to the Past. Each story since the Super Nintendo entry has been crafted around Link's quest to obtain this legendary blade".

See also 
It's dangerous to go alone!

References 

Magic items
The Legend of Zelda
Fictional swords
Fictional elements introduced in 1991
Video game objects